Lorina Kamburova (25 October 1991 – 27 May 2021) was a Bulgarian actress.

Biography 
In 2014, Kamburova graduated from the National Academy for Theatre and Film Arts in Sofia. She later played in among others Nightworld, Leatherface, Doom: Annihilation.

Lorina Kamburova was born on October 25, 1991 in Varna. Her father dreamed of the name Lorina, meaning "crowned with a laurel wreath", described his dream to his wife and she agreed to call their daughter this name. She was baptized in the Christian faith on August 15, 1992 in the Church of the Assumption Bogoroditsa - Panagyia, also known as the Church of the "Little Mother of God", located in the central part of Varna (Stara Varna is oldest quarter of Varna town), in the so-called Greek quarter. Her sister lives in Varna and is 12 years younger than her . In 2003, her mother died of malignant lung cancer and the same year her grandmother Elena took over the upbringing of Lorina. Twelve years later, their father died of a heart attack and stroke, expecting a healthy heart transplant.

During her studies at the Krastyo Sarafov National Academy of Theater and Film Arts, in the class of Professor Zdravko Mitkov, she lived in block 29 in the Studentski Grad - district of Sofia.

Lorina Kamburova was the cousin of Alek Alexiev and it was Stoyan Alexiev who chose a monologue for her audition for the Academy, that of Gerda in the scene where she melts Kai in "The Snow Queen". For the first time in her life, she took the stage in her hometown of Varna at the age of 8 years. In 2014 she graduated in Acting for Drama Theater from the National Academy of Theater and Film Arts in the class of Professor Zdravko Kirilov Mitkov (born March 11, 1952 in Kyustendil). She participated in the theatrical productions of "A Midsummer Night's Dream", "The Blessed Virgin of Paris", "Flight", "The Lord of the Flies", and "Unnatural Selection".

The 17-year-old Kamburova participated in the reality TV show "Music Idol", reaching the final of the third season in 2009. She was a vocalist in the group Ross’n'Lorina together with Rosen Penchev. Alongside Mak Marinov, she acted in Stefan Valdobrev's music video "This Song Is Not For Love".

Lorina Kamburova was actively involved in the dubbing of films and series from 2014 until her death. One of her first roles was in the animated film "The Penguins of Madagascar", recorded in the Alexandra Audio studio.
Kamburova is the Bulgarian voice of May May in "Kung Fu Panda 3", Chenille in "Trolls", Gumball in "The Incredible World of Gumball" (in the later seasons replacing Vasil Peykov), Splinter in "Maya the Bee: The Honey Games", Felicia in "Ballerina", Cortley Jester in "Ever After High", and Rose Tico in "Star Wars: Episode VIII - The Last Jedi" and "Star Wars: Episode IX - The Rise of Skywalker".
She also provided voices for "100 Things to Do Before High School", "Godfathers of Wizards", "The House of Shumnikov", and the series "Total Drama Island". 

From 2015 to 2016 Lorina Kamburova played Liya in the series "Връзки" (in translation "Relationships") broadcast on Bulgarian TV channel bTV . In the period 2016-2017, she played the role of Anna in about 170 episodes of the comedy-drama series "Скъпи наследници"  (as translate: "Dear Heirs"), broadcast in 2018 on the bulgarian TV channel bTV.

In 2012, she starred in two of the 78 episodes of the turkish TV series "Riders" ("Biniciler"), directed by Serdan Akar and produced by Muharrem Gülmez, portraying the lives of nomadic tribes. In 2020 she played the role of the Bulgarian border police officer Boyana, in the initial hour and 23 minute version of the Russian comedy-fantasy film "Love and Monsters".

Death 
Kamburova died in Moscow on 27 May 2021, at the age of 29, during her sleep. She needed a lung transplant and was planning one at a hospital in Vienna, the capital of Austria. Lorina recovered from bilateral pneumonia and COVID-19, but developed further post COVID-19 complications. Her funeral took place on 6 June 2021, in her birth place Varna.

Filmography

References

External links 
 

21st-century Bulgarian actresses
Bulgarian film actresses
Bulgarian stage actresses
Bulgarian voice actresses
1991 births
2021 deaths
Actors from Varna, Bulgaria
Deaths from pneumonia in Russia
National Academy for Theatre and Film Arts alumni
Deaths from the COVID-19 pandemic in Russia